The Glass Ball is a 1937 German drama film directed by Peter Stanchina and starring Albrecht Schoenhals, Sabine Peters, and Hilde von Stolz.

The film's sets were designed by the art directors Otto Guelstorff and Hans Minzloff. Location shooting took place in Berlin and Vienna in late 1936.

Cast

References

Bibliography

External links 
 

1937 films
1937 drama films
German drama films
Films of Nazi Germany
1930s German-language films
Bavaria Film films
German black-and-white films
1930s German films